Nowmaleh (also Romanized as Nowmāleh; also known as Nowmāleh-ye ‘Olyā) is a village in Qaedrahmat Rural District, Zagheh District, Khorramabad County, Lorestan Province, Iran. At the 2006 census, its population was 41, in 9 families.

References 

Towns and villages in Khorramabad County